Flying Start may refer to:

 Flying Start (song), a song by Mike Oldfield
 Flying Start (album), an album by The Blackbyrds
 Flying Start Challenge, a contest run by aerospace businesses and organisations in the South West of England